Teodor is a masculine given name. In English, it is a cognate of Theodore. Notable people with the name include:

Teodor Muzaka III, Albanian nobleman who was born in 1393.
 Teodor Andrault de Langeron (19th century), President of Warsaw
 Teodor Andrzej Potocki (1664-1738), Polish nobleman
 Teodor Anghelini (born 1954), retired Romanian football player and coach
 Teodor Anioła (1925-1993), Polish footballer
 Teodor Atanasov (footballer) (born 1987), Bulgarian footballer
 Teodor Axentowicz (1859-1938), Polish painter
 Teodor Bujnicki (1907-1944), Polish poet
 Teodor Calmășul (18th century), Romanian boyar
 Teodor Filipović (1778-1807), Serbian lawyer
 Teodor Frunzeti (born 1955), Romanian Land Forces general
 Teodor Ilić Češljar (1746-1793), Serbian painter
 Teodor Ilincăi (born 1983), Romanian opera tenor
 Teodor Kazimierz Czartoryski (1704-1768), bishop of Poznań
 Teodor Keko (1958-2002), Albanian writer
 Teodor Koskenniemi (1887-1965), Finnish athlete
 Teodor Kračun (18th century), Serbian painter
 Teodor Leszetycki (1830-1915), Polish pianist, teacher and composer
 Teodor Lubomirski (1683-1745), Polish nobleman
 Teodor Meleșcanu (born 1941), Romanian politician, diplomat and jurist
 Teodor Moraru (1938-2011), contemporary Romanian painter
 Teodor Narbutt (1784-1864), Polish-Lithuanian writer, Romanticist historian and military engineer
 Teodor Negoiță (born 1947), Romanian polar region explorer
 Teodor Parnicki (1908-1988), Polish writer
 Teodor Peterek (1910-1969), Polish soccer player
 Teodor Popescu (20th century), Romanian bobsledder
 Teodor Regedziński (1894-1954), Polish chess master
 Teodor Rotrekl (1923-2004), Czech illustrator and painter
 Teodor Teodorov (1859-1924), Bulgarian politician

See also
 Saint Theodore (disambiguation)
 Theodor
  Teodor., taxonomic author abbreviation for Emanoil C. Teodorescu (1866–1949), Romanian botanist

References

Masculine given names
Albanian masculine given names
Bulgarian masculine given names
Czech masculine given names
Polish masculine given names
Romanian masculine given names
Serbian masculine given names
Swedish masculine given names